Ronny Lynn Jackson (born May 4, 1967) is an American physician, politician, and retired United States Navy rear admiral who is the U.S. representative for . 

Jackson joined the White House Medical Unit in the mid-2000s under George W. Bush, and served as Physician to the President from 2013 to 2018 under Barack Obama and Donald Trump. On March 28, 2018, Trump nominated Jackson to be United States secretary of veterans affairs to succeed David Shulkin. On April 23, 2018, allegations of misconduct and mismanagement during his service in the White House were reported. The administration disputed the allegations. Concern was also expressed about Jackson's lack of management experience. On April 26, 2018, Jackson withdrew his nomination as Secretary of Veterans Affairs.

On February 2, 2019, Trump appointed Jackson Assistant to the President and Chief Medical Advisor, a new position in the Executive Office. Jackson retired from the Navy on December 1, 2019, and on December 9, he filed to run for Congress in Texas's 13th congressional district. Placing second in the Republican primary, he won a runoff for the nomination and the November 3, 2020, general election.

Early life
Jackson was born to Waymon and Norma Jackson and raised in Levelland, Texas. He has a brother and a sister who live and work in Levelland. He attended Texas A&M University at Galveston, graduating in 1991 with a Bachelor of Science degree in marine biology. He attended medical school at the University of Texas Medical Branch, receiving his MD degree in 1995.

Military career

Jackson became a Navy officer in 1995, when he received his M.D. from the University of Texas Medical Branch. He graduated from the Undersea Medical Officer Program in 1996. Jackson had a series of operational postings, as officer-in-charge and diving medical officer at Explosive Ordnance Disposal Mobile Unit 8 at the naval base in Sigonella, Sicily and diving safety officer at the Naval Safety Center in Norfolk, Virginia. In 2001, he started a residency in emergency medicine, which he completed in 2004. He was clinical faculty physician in the Emergency Medical Residency Program in Portsmouth, Virginia for an additional year before being deployed to Iraq in 2005, where he worked as emergency medicine physician with a surgical shock trauma platoon in Taqaddum.

In June 2006, Jackson became a physician in the White House Medical Unit (WHMU), ultimately working under three presidents. He became WHMU director in May 2010, and in July 2013 was given the additional title of Physician to the President. In December 2014, Jackson's duties as WHMU director ended, but he continued to be Physician to the President. In January 2017, Jackson made headlines after treating a girl who was bitten by Sunny, one of the Obamas' dogs.

Jackson continued to be Physician to the President during the Donald Trump administration. Upon taking office, Trump gave Jackson the additional title of Deputy Assistant to the President. Jackson became close to Trump after delivering an hourlong press conference in which he gave a glowing assessment of Trump's health, praising Trump's "incredibly good genes" and his performance on a cognitive test ("exceedingly well") and claiming that "if he had a healthier diet over the last 20 years, he might live to be 200 years old." Jackson was criticized for the statements and accused of misstating Trump's height and weight in order to minimize his obesity. Trump appointed Jackson "Assistant to the President and Chief Medical Advisor" on February 2, 2019.

Jackson held the Navy rank of captain from May 1, 2010, to October 1, 2016, until he was promoted to rear admiral (lower half). Jackson was nominated for promotion to the two-star rank of rear admiral on March 20, 2018, but the Senate Committee on Armed Services returned the nomination to the president on January 3, 2019, without action. He was renominated by Trump for promotion again on January 15, 2019, but it was again returned to the president without action. Jackson retired from the Navy on December 1, 2019, as a rear admiral (lower half).

Nomination as Secretary of Veterans Affairs
On March 28, 2018, Trump announced that he planned to nominate Jackson to succeed David Shulkin as Secretary of Veterans Affairs. Some senators expressed skepticism of the nomination due to Jackson's lack of management experience.

On April 23, 2018, the U.S. Senate Committee on Veterans' Affairs postponed a hearing on Jackson's nomination after current and former White House medical staff accused him of creating a hostile work environment, excessive drinking on the job, and dispensing medication improperly. Senator Jon Tester told CNN on April 24 that Jackson was known as "the candy man" at the White House, according to around 20 people who brought these concerns to the Veterans' Affairs Senate Committee, because he allegedly handed out Ambien, Provigil, and other prescription drugs "like they were candy".

CNN also reported that during an overseas trip in 2015, an intoxicated Jackson loudly knocked on a female employee's hotel room door so noisily that the Secret Service reportedly stopped him to prevent him potentially waking up Obama. In response to the CNN story, ABC News reported that the Secret Service had no records of any incidents involving Jackson causing commotions at hotels in 2015 when Secret Service personnel were guarding Obama. Trump responded during a news conference the next day, calling Jackson "one of the finest people that I have met" but also hinting that Jackson might drop out, while blaming Democrats for mounting an unfair attack on his record.

Jackson withdrew himself from consideration for Secretary of Veterans Affairs on April 26, 2018, after the Senate Committee on Veterans' Affairs began formally investigating the allegations. He insisted that the allegations were "completely false and fabricated" and said he was withdrawing because the controversy had become a distraction for Trump and his agenda. Jackson returned to work in the White House Medical Unit but did not return to his position as Trump's personal physician; he was replaced in that position by Navy officer Sean Conley, who took over that role a month earlier in acting capacity. The 115th Congress returned this nomination to Trump on January 3, 2019, without it being considered in the Senate Committee on Armed Services.

Inspector General investigation and report
In May 2018, after receiving 12 complaints about Jackson's conduct, the Department of Defense Office of Inspector General (OIG) opened an investigation. The investigation stalled from October 2018 to August 2019 because the Trump White House Counsel's Office objected to the investigation and considered invoking executive privilege, but ultimately did not.

OIG investigators interviewed Jackson and 78 witnesses. The OIG found that its interview of Jackson "was limited in scope and unproductive" because lawyers in the Trump White House Counsel's office insisted upon participating in the interview and "instructed Jackson not to answer any questions concerning events after his appointment as the Physician to the President in July 2013." The OIG report was issued in March 2021.

On March 2, 2021, the inspector general of the Department of Defense briefed members of Congress on its review. Its report documented Jackson's inappropriate interactions with subordinates and improper use of alcohol while on duty.

The OIG concluded, by a preponderance of the evidence, that Jackson had "made sexual and denigrating statements about one of his female medical subordinates to another of his subordinates"; that Jackson "drank alcohol with his subordinates in Manila, became intoxicated, and, while in his hotel room, engaged in behavior that witnesses described as screaming and yelling, and behavior that some complained might wake the President"; and that Jackson took Ambien (a sleep medication) during official travel, "raising concerns about his potential incapacity to provide proper medical care during this travel." In addition to findings that Jackson had "engaged in inappropriate conduct involving the use of alcohol" during two presidential trips, the report also found that he "disparaged, belittled, bullied, and humiliated subordinates"; "created a negative WHMU work environment"; and "failed to conduct himself in an exemplary manner and made an unfavorable impact on the overall WHMU command climate."

After the report was issued, Jackson said that the allegations were a "political hit job because I stood with President Trump" and that they "resurrected those same false allegations from my years with the Obama Administration because I have refused to turn my back on President Trump."

U.S. House of Representatives

Elections

2020 

On December 9, 2019, Jackson filed to run for Congress in Texas's 13th congressional district. The seat came open when 13-term incumbent Republican Mac Thornberry announced he would not seek reelection in 2020. Jackson finished in second place in the Republican primary–the real contest in this heavily Republican district–behind former Texas Cattle Feeders Association lobbyist Josh Winegarner, and the two faced off in a July 14 runoff election for the nomination. Jackson defeated Winegarner, 55.58% to 44.42%. According to The New York Times, Jackson "ran a campaign based on his close relationship with President Trump." He leveraged that relationship to obtain assistance from two top officials with Trump's reelection campaign, Justin Clark and Bill Stepien.

In May 2020, Jackson claimed without evidence that Obama had spied on the Trump campaign, and accused him of "[weaponizing] the highest levels of our government to spy on President Trump." Jackson added, "Every Deep State traitor deserves to be brought to justice for their heinous actions."

Jackson opposes mask mandates to halt the spread of COVID-19. He has said, "I think that wearing a mask is a personal choice, and I don't particularly want my government telling me that I have to wear a mask."

Jackson won the general election, taking 79.4% of the vote to Democratic nominee Gus Trujillo's 18.5%. Since Thornberry was elected in the 1994 Republican wave, no Democrat has crossed the 40% mark in the district, and only three have managed 30%.

Tenure 
Jackson attended the January 6 "Stop the Steal" rally at the White House Ellipse. During the January 6 attack, he was inside the Capitol when members of the Oath Keepers militia allegedly exchanged text messages about protecting Jackson who had "critical data." Oathkeeper leader Stewart Rhodes replied, writing: "Give him my cell". Rhodes was later charged with seditious conspiracy. That same day, during the certification of the 2020 election, Jackson objected to certifying Arizona's and Pennsylvania's electoral votes.

On May 19, 2021, Jackson voted against legislation to establish the formation of a January 6 commission meant to investigate the storming of the U.S. Capitol. On May 2, 2022, the January 6 committee released a letter to Jackson requesting he meet with the committee; in response, Jackson released a statement calling the committee "illegitimate".

In late February 2021, Jackson and a dozen other Republican House members skipped votes and enlisted others to vote for them, citing the ongoing COVID-19 pandemic. But he and the other members were actually attending the Conservative Political Action Conference, which was held at the same time as their absences. In response, the Campaign for Accountability, an ethics watchdog group, filed a complaint with the House Committee on Ethics and requested an investigation into Jackson and the other lawmakers.

Jackson, along with all other Senate and House Republicans, voted against the American Rescue Plan Act of 2021.

In June 2021, Jackson was one of 14 House Republicans to vote against legislation to establish June 19, or Juneteenth, as a federal holiday.

In November 2021, Jackson created a conspiracy theory that Democrats made up the Omicron variant of COVID-19 (he called it "MEV - the Midterm Election Variant") as "a reason to push unsolicited nationwide mail-in ballots" and to "cheat" in the upcoming midterm elections.

In May 2022, the Office of Congressional Ethics reported that there was "substantial reason" to believe that Jackson had used campaign funds for personal use, to pay for unlimited access for himself and his wife to the Amarillo Club, a private dining club in Amarillo, Texas. Jackson refused to cooperate with the Congressional investigation, and his campaign's treasurer and accounting firm refused to provide documents to investigators.

In December 2022, Jackson falsely claimed that Representative Katie Porter had asserted that "pedophilia is not a crime" but "an identity", referring to a deceptively edited video of a congressional hearing. 

Jackson has endorsed Trump's campaign in the 2024 presidential election.

Committee assignments 

 Committee on Foreign Affairs
 Committee on Armed Services

Caucus memberships
Republican Study Committee

Personal life
Jackson has a wife, Jane, and three children.

Awards and decorations
Jackson's decorations, awards, and badges include, among others:

See also
 Unsuccessful nominations to the Cabinet of the United States

References

External links

Representative Ronny Jackson official U.S. House website
Ronny Jackson for Congress

Appearances on C-SPAN

|-

|-

|-

1967 births
Living people
Harvard Medical School faculty
Military personnel from Texas
Obama administration personnel
People from Levelland, Texas
Physicians to the President
Recipients of the Defense Superior Service Medal
Recipients of the Legion of Merit
Rejected or withdrawn nominees to the United States Executive Cabinet
Republican Party members of the United States House of Representatives from Texas
Texas A&M University alumni
Trump administration personnel
United States Navy rear admirals (lower half)
United States Navy Medical Corps officers
University of Texas Medical Branch alumni